Vietnam Children's Fund (VCF) is a non-profit organization based in Unionville, Virginia, United States. The group's mission is to help the children of Vietnam. Independent of any actual affiliations, it is still an unaffiliated partner with the Fund For Fallen Allies (FFFA) charity that is based in nearby Alexandria, Virginia.

It builds "turnkey" schools to modern standards, ready for occupation.

The Vietnam Children's Fund mission is to build a network of elementary schools in Vietnam as a living memorial to all those who perished in the Vietnam War.

History

The Vietnam Children's Fund was founded in 1993 by Kieu Chinh, an actress, lecturer, and philanthropist, Terry Anderson, journalist, and the late Lewis Burwell Puller, Jr., a Pulitzer Prize-winning writer and severely wounded marine. Puller believed that in war no one goes unscathed but that children, the most vulnerable of all, suffer the greatest hardships. He felt the Vietnam Children's Fund was a gesture that could not only help close the past but ensure a brighter future for the children of Vietnam.

The first school, located on the former demilitarized zone in Quảng Trị Province, was dedicated in Puller's name in April 1994, the 20th anniversary of the end of the war.

VCF has now completed 50 schools which serve more than 30,000 children. Many schools are built in the poorest and most remote areas of the country where the need is greatest.

Nature and goals

VCF's signature design is a modern two-storey facility that serves 350 children (or as many as 700 attending in shifts) and provides eight classrooms, a library, electricity, and bathrooms. As the schools are often the newest and most structurally sound buildings in these communities they are also used for town gatherings, meetings and celebrations. In areas prone to flooding, the VCF school may be the only two-storey building in a region where villagers can go to escape disaster. Quality control, accountability for funds, sound engineering, and sound design are keystones of VCF activity in Vietnam.

Normally, 85 cents of each dollar raised goes directly to school construction. VCF does not take government funds. Funding is all private from individuals, foundations, corporations and the Combined Federal Campaign. Corporate gifts include those from FedEx, Coca-Cola, Citigroup, Conoco and American Eagle Outfitters.

With a million babies born in Vietnam each year, the need for new schools could not be met even with the most generous imaginable foreign aid from all countries and World Bank assistance. Thus, funds used by VCF do not duplicate or substitute for any activity of other donors. VCF meets a need that otherwise would simply not be fulfilled.

VCF hopes to build one elementary school in each of Vietnam's provinces and to create enough classroom space to teach 58,000 children—the number of names on the Vietnam Memorial Wall in Washington, DC.

Board of directors
Current director:

 Bình Nguyen, Chairman, Binh is a 40-year veteran with FedEx, the last eleven as Senior Manager, Indochina & Myanmar, and Chief Representative for Vietnam. He established FedEx operations in Vietnam in 1994 through a business alliance with Hanoi and Ho Chi Minh City Post and Telecommunications, which are under Vietnam Post and Telecommunication. The company has representation in Ho Chi Minh City, Hanoi, Haiphong, Danang and other large provincial cities across Vietnam. Binh helped arrange for the first air carrier collaboration between FedEx, VASCO, and Corporate Air to begin direct service five times a week between FedEx’s Asia-Pacific hub in Subic Bay, the Philippines and HCM City in 2001. Binh has held various management positions with FedEx in customer service, marketing, airport and ground operations. Binh has been an active AmCham member since 1994. He was elected to the Board of Governors in 2000 and was elected Chairman of the Board of Governors in 2004. He is a former manager at the Defense Attache’s Office (DAO) at the US Embassy in the former Saigon 1972-1975, and attended colleges in Virginia and Texas. He is past chairman of the Aviation Committee of the Amarillo TX Chamber of Commerce.

Former directors include:
Terry A. Anderson, Co-Chair. Mr. Anderson is a former U.S. Marine who served in Vietnam. He was Associated Press Bureau Chief in Beirut when taken hostage by radical fundamentalists and remained a captive for seven years. He is Honorary Chairman of the Committee to Protect Journalists.
Kiều Chinh, Co-Chair. Twice a refugee in her homeland, Ms. Chinh is an actress and lives in California.

See also
List of non-governmental organizations in Vietnam
Non-profit organizations

References

External links
Vietnam Children's Fund Home Page

Charities based in Virginia
Foreign charities operating in Vietnam
Non-profit organizations based in Unionville, Virginia
Children's charities based in the United States
Orange County, Virginia
Development charities based in the United States
Educational foundations in the United States
Community-building organizations